Community forestry is an evolving branch of forestry whereby the local community plays a significant role in forest management and land use decision making by themselves in the facilitating support of government as well as change agents.  It involves the participation and collaboration of various stakeholders including community, government and non-governmental organisations (NGOs).  The level of involvement of each of these groups is dependent on the specific community forest project, the management system in use and the region.  It gained prominence in the mid-1970s and examples of community forestry can now be seen in many countries including Nepal, Indonesia, Korea, Brazil, India and North America.

Overview

Community forestry is a branch of forestry that deals with the communal management of forests for generating income from timber and non-timber forest products as forms of goods while in other hand regulating ecosystem, downstream settlements benefits from watershed conservation, carbon sequestration and aesthetic values as in forms of services. It has been considered one of the most promising options of combining forest conservation with rural development and community empowerment and poverty reduction objectives. Community forestry is defined by the Food and Agricultural Organization of the United Nations as "any situation that intimately involves local people in forestry activity".  Community forestry exists when the local community in an area plays a significant role in land use decision-making and when the community is satisfied with its involvement and benefits from the management of the surrounding forest and its resources.

Community forestry is first implemented through the establishment of a legal and institutional framework including the revision of legal norms and regulations for forest management, the development of National Forest Plans and the strengthening of decentralization processes to sub-national levels of government. The second principal line of action is the implementation of pilot projects to demonstrate the feasibility of the community forestry framework . However, a study by the Overseas Development Institute shows that the technical, managerial and financial requirements stipulated by the framework are often incompatible with local realities and interests. A successful legal and institutional framework will incorporate the strengthening of existing institutions and enable the dissemination of locally appropriate practices as well as the local capacity for regulation and control.

In a 2016 review of community-based forestry, FAO estimated that almost one-third of the world's forest area is under some form of community-based management.

History
Community forestry first came to prominence in the mid-1970s and has continued to evolve over the last few decades in a growing number of countries.  The availability of forest resources are often greatly reduced for use by the local people due to increasing pressures to cultivate the land, reliance on the forest resources are also affected by economic and political changes.   The evolution of community forestry in Nepal dates back to the late 1970s and was first instilled as an attempt to improve the management of forest resources and address environmental issues that were of great concern with the countries failing centralized forest policy.   Over the past two decades, community forestry has been applied successfully in many developing countries, with its main goal being the alleviation of poverty amongst local forest communities and forest conservation.  More recently, community forestry has been implemented in developing countries and it has been successful in its aims of sustainable forest management, climate change adaptation plan of action,  and securing socio-economic benefits for local communities.

Stakeholders
There is a large variety of stakeholders involved when considering community forestry.  Participation from some of the various levels of community, government and non-government organisations (NGOs) are essential in the project's success. 
While specific stakeholders vary between different community forestry projects the primary stakeholder groups are as follows:

Table 1. Common stakeholders involved with community forestry.

Stakeholders of community forestry have a vested interest to establish sustainable practices, whether this be to develop and maintain a regular income, ensure that forests are sufficiently protected to ensure their longevity or to reduce illegal activities and manage the area in such a way to promote tourism and conservation. In this situation, stakeholders came to conclusion to handover forest resources to local communities for conserving, managing and utilization by their own decision.  Despite significant development, continued improvement in the collaboration between local governments and forest communities seems to be a key point for better community forest management. A wide range of futures scenarios have been put up to help the environmental decision process.

Challenges
A study conducted in the Brazilian Amazon determined that there are a number of challenges that must be faced when developing a sustainable management strategy for community forestry. These challenges are outlined in Table 2 and Figure 1 shows the impact each management challenge has on other obstacles. The model is segregated into two phases: the development phase during which several enabling factors (land ownership, organisational capacity, technical knowledge and capital) are needed to obtain a legal management permit and secondly the operational phase where factors (clandestine loggers, access to markets, infrastructure and managerial skills) influence the successfulness of the management program.  Each of the challenges outlined in Table 1 must be addressed in order for a self-sustaining community forestry management program to be established.

Table 2. Challenges faced by stakeholders managing forests

Best practices 
For a conservation program within a Community forest to succeed, community involvement is imperative. Governments with interest in forest conservation introduce statewide policies and legislations which have historically failed to deliver the desired outcomes such as in China, Nepal and Peru.  Moreover, no single stakeholder by itself can ensure the success of such a program.

Wildlife conservation
Though there is a little research on the role of community forestry to wildlife conservation, some empirical studies suggests that it help in wildlife conservation. It is done by decreasing the human disturbance, increasing regeneration of forest and increasing of ground cover.

Nepal 
Common land in Nepal is owned by the state which often does not have the capacity to monitor and manage the area. This often leads to the over use of the resources by the community due to lack of incentives. To overcome this, programs involving community participation were introduced and 'Forest User Groups' (FUG) formed to manage the forests resources without giving them ownership of the land. Community forest management system in Nepal becomes one of the successful program out of 8 around world that is recognized on Rio 20+. This has resulted in better outcomes in the region.

Indonesia 
Villagers from three communities in Bantaeng district in Indonesia, with the assistance of a funded project obtained a Forest management license and secured a 35-year lease on their local forest. With the incentive to preserve their source of income, the villagers have had a positive impact on forest conservation. This is now viewed as a reference model for the Ministry of Forestry's future projects.

Korea 
Farmers enter into a profit sharing contract with the 'Village Forestry Association' (VFA) to form a cooperative which assists farmers with reforestation in keeping with the legislation. VFA, though loosely linked to the Office of Forestry enjoys a degree of autonomy facilitating community participation. This system demonstrates the desirable mix of top-down and bottom-up planning ensuring government control as well as effective reforestation through active community participation.

Management system 
As it is unlikely for any two areas to have identical socio-economic and environmental conditions, there is no blueprint management plan that would provide a blanket solution to all the problems. Based on research over several years in Nepal, it was noted that to have and effective management system, we need to identify variables which would affect the success of the system and group them into the following five sets: 
(I) attributes of the resource system,
(II) attributes of the user group,
(III) attributes of the governance system,
(IV) attributes relating to interactions between the user group and resource, and
(V) attributes relating to interactions between the governance system and the resource.

 
In some cases, it is unrealistic to expect progress in a community level management of forest activities, as often conflict arise with respect to land use and benefit sharing within the community. Such issues can be overcome by recognising that a community level of management may not be the most effective management technique.  Instead, adopting the following approach will provide a solution –
(I) Management by smaller work groups within the community, sharing common interest in the resources.
(II) A clear management plan with specific benefit sharing arrangement within the work group.
(III) Develop management systems which are within the expertise of the working group.

Faith communities are increasingly participating in efforts to promote ecological sustainability. Whereas the last 50–100 years has seen them lease out their territory to industry, they are beginning to reclaim and restore this land. Their recognition amongst local and national authorities have allowed community forestry schemes to develop and there have been several highly successful efforts across Cambodia, which have been extended to Vietnam and Laos. In September 2010, Buddhists monks were awarded the UNDP's Equator Prize for their ongoing conservation work. This comprises the establishment of tree nurseries, seedling distribution, ordination activities, composting schemes and a vegetable garden. The site has become a valuable source of information and environmental education as well as a base for the local community. Villagers regularly hold panel discussions about how they can go on to best take advantage of what the natural forest has to offer without destroying it.

Incentives

Farm forest for household use 
(I) Preserving the source of community's livelihood
(II) Maintaining soil integrity by preventing erosion.
(III) Use of fuel wood and fodder – Planting trees to provide fuel wood as well as fodder for cattle can be encouraged in ways that do not conflict with cash crops and food production. e.g. The Neem tree was introduced in West Africa and is now the most widely grown tree in the drier parts of the continent. It was easily cultivated and provides the farmers with good timber, fuel and shade.
(IV) Developing nursery networks through support activities which assist with subsidies. This encourages entrepreneurship to produce tree planting stock for sale.

Farm forests for markets 

Tree growing can take on the character of a crop where there is a market for wood products such as poles, fuel wood and, pulp for production of paper. Companies tie up with farmers for supply of these products giving a steady source of income to the farming community. For example, in Philippines, over 3000 farmers cultivate trees for pulp production for an industry that provides a market as well as a minimum price for the product,  and Cooperatives of Village Forestry Association in Korea have helped local communities cater to a growing market in forest products such as timber and mushrooms.

See also
 Common land
 
 Tragedy of the commons

References

External links
 Community Forestry, Buddhism and Cambodian Heritage: Award-winning film made by Cambodian monks on their reforestation programmes.
 Mlup Baitong Official Website: NGO heavily involved in reforestation projects and advocating environmental education in Cambodia.

Forestry
Community-based forestry
Forestry in Nepal